Elachista liskai  is a moth of the family Elachistidae. It is found in Slovakia.

The forewing ground colour is unicolorous pale yellow with concolorous fringe scales. The basal third of the costa is narrowly grey. The hindwings are grey above, with paler yellowish grey fringe scales. The underside of both wings is leaden grey, with yellowish white fringe scales.

References

liskai
Moths described in 2011
Endemic fauna of Slovakia
Moths of Europe